Galt Island (Florida) is an island off the west coast of Florida. It is a part of St. James City in Lee County, near Fort Myers Beach. It contains the Galt Island Archeological District.

Geography

References

Islands of Florida
Islands of Lee County, Florida